A Praxis test is one of a series of American teacher certification exams written and administered by the Educational Testing Service.  Various Praxis tests are usually required before, during, and after teacher training courses in the U.S.

In order to be a teacher in about half of the states in the US, the Praxis test is required. It usually consists of two separate tests, Praxis 1 and 2. In some states, alternative teacher certification programs allow prospective educators to obtain licensure without taking Praxis tests.

The Praxis I, or Pre-Professional Skills Test (PPST), consisted of three exams: reading, writing, and mathematics. On September 1, 2014, ETS transitioned to the Praxis "CASE" or "Core Academic Skills for Educators" which also consists of reading, writing, and mathematics exams. These sections can be taken as a combined test or separately. In most colleges and universities, a passing score must be earned for admission to teacher education. In most states, a passing score must be earned before the teacher education graduate can apply for his or her teaching license or certificate.

The Praxis II assessments cover many different subject areas.  Each state requires a different combination of Praxis II exams for certification. In many states, these include a content knowledge and a pedagogy exam. In some states, students must pass these exams before being accepted into the student teaching component of the program.  Many states use the Praxis II tests as a way to determine highly qualified teachers status under the No Child Left Behind Act. The Praxis II School Counseling specialty exam is used by some states as a licensure requirement to practice professional school counseling.

It replaced the National Teacher Examination (NTE), also administered by ETS.

List of current Praxis II subject tests
 
 Art: Content and Analysis
 Art: Content Knowledge
 American Sign Language
 Biology and General Science
 Biology: Content Essays
 Biology: Content Knowledge
 Braille Proficiency
 Business Education: Content Knowledge
 Chemistry: Short Word Essays
 Chemistry: Content Knowledge
 Chemistry, Physics and General Science
 Chinese (Mandarin): World Language
 Citizenship Education: Content Knowledge
 Communication
 Cooperative Education
 Driver Education
 Early Childhood: Content Essays
 Early Childhood Education
 Earth and Space Sciences: Content Knowledge
 Economics
 Education of Deaf and Hard of Hearing Students
 Education of Young Children
 Educational Leadership: Administration and Supervision
 Elementary Education: Content Knowledge
 Elementary Education: Curriculum, Instruction and Assessment
 Elementary Education: Instructional Practice and Applications
 Elementary Education: Multiple Subjects
 English Language Arts: Content and Analysis
 English Language Arts: Content Knowledge
 English Language, Literature and Composition: Content and Analysis
 English Language, Literature and Composition: Content Knowledge
 English Language, Literature and Composition: Pedagogy
 English to Speakers of Other Languages
 Environmental Education
 Family and Consumer Sciences
 French: World Language
 Fundamental Subjects: Content Knowledge
 General Science: Content Essays
 General Science: Content Knowledge
 Geography
 German: World Language
 Gifted Education
 Government/Political Science
 Health and Physical Education: Content Knowledge
 Health Education
 Interdisciplinary Early Childhood Education
 Journalism
 Latin
 Library Media Specialist
 Life Science: Pedagogy
 Marketing Education
 Mathematics: Content Knowledge
 Mathematics: Pedagogy
 Middle School: Content Knowledge
 Middle School English Language Arts
 Middle School Mathematics
 Middle School: Multiple Subjects
 Middle School Science
 Middle School Social Studies
 Music: Analysis
 Music: Concepts and Processes
 Music: Content and Instruction
 Music: Content Knowledge
 Physical Education: Content and Design
 Physical Education: Content Knowledge
 Physical Education: Movement Forms - Analysis and Design
 Physical Science: Content Knowledge
 Physical Science: Pedagogy
 Physics: Content Essays
 Physics: Content Knowledge
 Pre-Kindergarten Education
 Principles of Learning and Teaching: Early Childhood
 Principles of Learning and Teaching: Grades K-6
 Principles of Learning and Teaching: Grades 5-9
 Principles of Learning and Teaching: Grades 7-12
 Professional School Counselor
 Psychology
 Reading Across the Curriculum: Elementary
 Reading Specialist
 Safety/Driver Education
 School Guidance and Counseling
 School Psychologist
 School Social Worker: Content Knowledge
 Social Sciences: Content Knowledge
 Social Studies: Content and Interpretation
 Social Studies: Content Knowledge
 Sociology
 Spanish: World Language
 Special Education: Core Knowledge and Applications
 Special Education: Core Knowledge and Mild to Moderate Applications
 Special Education: Core Knowledge and Severe to Profound Applications
 Special Education: Education of Deaf and Hard of Hearing Students
 Special Education: Early Childhood
 Special Education: Preschool/Early Childhood
 Special Education: Teaching Speech to Students with Language Impairments
 Special Education: Teaching Students w/ Behavioral Disorders/Emotional Disturbances
 Special Education: Teaching Students w/ Learning Disabilities
 Special Education: Teaching Students w/ Mental Retardation
 Special Education: Teaching Students w/ Visual Impairments
 Speech Communication: Content Knowledge
 Speech-Language Pathology
 Teaching Foundations: English
 Teaching Foundations: Mathematics
 Teaching Foundations: Multiple Subjects
 Teaching Foundations: Science
 Teaching Reading
 Teaching Reading: Elementary Education
 Technology Education
 Vocational General Knowledge
 World and U.S. History: Content Knowledge
 World Languages Pedagogy

Individual states that use the Praxis II
 Alabama
 Alaska
 Arkansas
 Colorado
 Connecticut
 Delaware
 District of Columbia
 Georgia
 Guam
 Hawaii
 Idaho
 Indiana
 Iowa
 Kansas
 Kentucky
 Louisiana
 Maryland
 Maine
 Mississippi
 Nebraska
 New Jersey
 New Hampshire
 Nevada
 North Carolina
 North Dakota
 Northern Mariana Islands
 Ohio
 Pennsylvania
 Rhode Island
 South Carolina
 South Dakota
 Tennessee
 Utah
 US Virgin Islands
 Vermont
 Virginia
 West Virginia
 Wisconsin
 Wyoming

Teacher certification examinations in individual states
Examples of states that require teaching candidates to pass their state-specific tests, in lieu of the Praxis:
 Alabama (AECTP)
 Arizona (AEPA)
 California (CBEST and California Subject Examinations for Teachers, also known as CSET)
 Colorado (PLACE)
 Florida (FTCE)
 Georgia (GACE)
 Illinois (ILTS)
 Massachusetts (MTEL)
 Michigan (MTTC)
 Minnesota (MTLE)
 Missouri (CBASE)
 New Mexico (NMTA)
 New York (NYSTCE)
 Ohio (OAE)
 Oklahoma (OGET, OPTE, Subject area)
 Oregon (ORELA)
 Pennsylvania (PAPA, PECT)
 Texas (TExES)
 Virginia (RVE)
 Washington (WEST-B/WEST-E/NES)
 Wisconsin (NES)

External links
 The Official Site from ETS
 Contemporary Educational Psychology—a Wikibook organized to support preparation for the Praxis II test called "Principles of Learning and Teaching"
 —List of states that use the Praxis II test.

School examinations
Standardized tests in the United States